Rezső Velez (31 August 1887 – 15 May 1971) was a Hungarian sports shooter. He competed in four events at the 1912 Summer Olympics and seven events at the 1924 Summer Olympics.

References

External links
 

1887 births
1971 deaths
Hungarian male sport shooters
Olympic shooters of Hungary
Shooters at the 1912 Summer Olympics
Shooters at the 1924 Summer Olympics
People from Komárom
Sportspeople from Komárom-Esztergom County